Schiano is a surname. Notable people with the surname include:

Greg Schiano, former head coach of the Tampa Bay Buccaneers
Mario Schiano, Italian saxophonist 
Rita Schiano, American novelist
Thomas D. Schiano, organ transplantation specialist
Kristina Schiano, American drummer